The 2015 Conference Premier play-off Final, known as the 2015 Vanarama Conference Promotion Final for sponsorship reasons, was a football match between Bristol Rovers and Grimsby Town played on 17 May 2015 at Wembley Stadium in London. It was the thirteenth Conference Premier play-off Final, the eighth to be played at Wembley and the first to feature either side.

The two participants finished the regular season in 2nd and 3rd respectively to qualify for the play-offs. Bristol Rovers overcame local rivals Forest Green Rovers 3–0 over two legs while Grimsby Town disposed of Eastleigh 5–1.

Bristol Rovers won the match 5–3 on penalties following a 1–1 draw after extra time. Rovers therefore became the first club since Carlisle United in 2005 to secure an immediate return to the Football League, after their relegation on the last day of the previous season. For Grimsby Town, it was the third successive season that they had failed to win promotion via the play-offs and were condemned to a sixth straight season in the fifth tier. The attendance of 47,029 was a record for a Conference Premier match, beating the previous best of 42,669 when Oxford United defeated York City to win promotion at the same venue in 2010.

Route to the final

Semi-finals
First leg

Second leg

Match

Summary
Grimsby Town got off to the perfect start when a purposeful run from Nathan Arnold set up Lenell John-Lewis to shoot from inside the penalty area. His shot was saved by Bristol Rovers goalkeeper Will Puddy but it deflected off John-Lewis' face into the goal, giving the Mariners the lead after just 1:38. Grimsby kept up the pressure and were unfortunate not to be playing against ten men as Puddy handled Ollie Palmer's shot outside the area. However, referee Ross Joyce deemed the offence only worthy of a yellow card. Just over 10 minutes later and Rovers were level after Grimsby failed to deal with a Jake Gosling corner, leaving Ellis Harrison to drive the ball past James McKeown.

The second half proved a much less open affair as players tired, defenders came out on top and errors were few and far between. Extra time was much the same, as chances for Chris Lines for Rovers and John-Lewis for Grimsby came to nothing. In the last minute of the extra time, Rovers manager Darrell Clarke switched Puddy for substitute keeper Steve Mildenhall for the inevitable penalty shoot-out, in a move reminiscent of that by Dutch coach Louis van Gaal at the previous year's World Cup. Clarke later stated that he felt Mildenhall would have "a better chance with his bigger frame."

The first five penalties of the shoot-out were successfully converted before Jon-Paul Pittman blazed his over the bar in front of the Grimsby fans. The following two were also successful, leaving veteran Lee Mansell with the deciding spot kick, which he powered in to McKeown's left.

Details

References

Play-off Final 2015
2015
Play-off Final 2015
Play-off Final 2015
Events at Wembley Stadium
Conference Premier play-off Final
Conference Premier play-off Final
Play-off National League Final 2015